Puritan (ACM-16/MMA-16) was built for the United States Army as U.S. Army Mine Planter (USAMP) Col. Alfred A. Maybach MP-13. The ship was transferred to the United States Navy and classified as an auxiliary minelayer. Puritan was never commissioned and thus never bore the "United States Ship" (USS) prefix showing status as a commissioned ship of the U.S. Navy.

Acquisition by the U.S. Navy 
Puritan was originally the Army mine planter USAMP Col. Alfred A. Maybach MP-13. Her transfer to the U.S. Navy was approved on 7 March 1951.

Out of Commission Status 
Upon transfer she was placed out of commission in reserve as the Auxiliary Mine Layer ACM-16, assigned to the San Francisco Group, Pacific Reserve Fleet. On 7 February 1955 she was reclassified as the Minelayer, Auxiliary MMA-16. She was named Puritan effective 1 May 1955. She remained out of commission in reserve berthed at Mare Island.

Disposal 
She was struck from the Navy Directory in 1959 and sold in 1961.

References

External links
 NavSource Online: Mine Warfare Vessel Photo Archive

Ships built in West Virginia
1942 ships
Mine planters of the United States Army
Camanche-class minelayers
World War II mine warfare vessels of the United States